The 1944–45 AHL season was the ninth season of the American Hockey League. Seven teams played 60 games each in the schedule. The Cleveland Barons won their third F. G. "Teddy" Oke Trophy as West Division champions, and their third Calder Cup as league champions.

Team changes
 The St. Louis Flyers transfer to the AHL from the defunct American Hockey Association, as an expansion team based in St. Louis, Missouri, playing in the West Division.

Final standings
Note: GP = Games played; W = Wins; L = Losses; T = Ties; GF = Goals for; GA = Goals against; Pts = Points;

Scoring leaders

Note: GP = Games played; G = Goals; A = Assists; Pts = Points; PIM = Penalty minutes

 complete list

Calder Cup playoffs

See also
List of AHL seasons

References
AHL official site
AHL Hall of Fame
HockeyDB

American Hockey League seasons
2